The Crimea Operation was a combined military offensive by Imperial German and Ukrainian forces in April 1918 against the Taurida Soviet Socialist Republic.

Background

Following the Russian Revolution in December 1918, the Crimean People's Republic was declared which encompassed the entire territory of Crimea. However, this proclamation was challenged by Bolshevik forces and by January 1919, Crimea was overrun and the Taurida Soviet Socialist Republic was declared. Upon seizing Crimea, Bolshevik forces enacted a campaign of terror upon the Crimean Tatar population, killing Muslim clerics and wealthy landowners with the express goal of eliminating the Tatarian "bourgeois nationalists". In addition to the internal campaign of terror, Bolshevik forces attacked Ukrainian and German forces in the neighboring Ukrainian People's Republic.

The operation

The Taurida Soviet Socialist Republic was quickly overrun by German and Ukrainian forces under command of Petro Bolbochan during the Crimean Offensive. The relative quick pace of the operation was due to desertion and widespread demoralization amongst the forces of Taurida, in addition to simultaneous peasant revolts across Crimea. By the end of April 1918, the majority of the members of the Central Executive Committee and the Council of People's Commissars, including council leader Anton Slutsky and local Bolshevik chief Jan Tarwacki, were arrested and shot in Alushta by insurgent Crimean Tatars, partially in reaction to the prior killing of Tatar independence leader Noman Çelebicihan by the Bolsheviks earlier in February. On 30 April, the Taurida SSR was abolishe and former Chief of Staff Mikhail Sablin raised the colours of the Ukrainian National Republic on 29 April  1918.

Aftermath

Despite the offensive violating the terms of the Treaty of Brest-Litovsk, German forces immediately set up a military administration in Crimea against the wishes of the local Tatar population. General Erich Ludendorff began plans to set Crimea up as a German colony and used the territory as a stepping stone for German offensives in the Caucasus region.

References

See also
 Operation Faustschlag
 Navy of the Ukrainian People's Republic

Conflicts in 1918
Battles of the Ukrainian–Soviet War
Battles involving Germany
April 1918 events
Crimea during the Russian Civil War
Ukraine in World War I